John B. Shaffer III (born June 25, 1968), known by his stage name Candyman, is an American rapper and record producer. He is best known for his hit single "Knockin' Boots". Candyman appears in the front row on N.W.A. and the Posse's 1987 album cover.

Biography
Candyman was born and raised in South Central Los Angeles, where he attended Washington Preparatory High School. Manson's friend, rapper/producer Sir Jinx, introduced Manson to Dr. Dre, for whom Manson produced a three-song demo.

Candyman was featured backing Tone Lōc before he earned his own solo stint. His first recording as solo artist was the 1989 12" EP Hip Hop Addict, produced by Candyman his late friend Johnny "J". Prior to signing with Epic, Bill Walker  from Thump Records, purchased the master of "Knockin' Boots" for Lowrider Soundtrack Volume 1 and took the single to KDAY and Power 106. Candyman eventually signed to Epic Records in 1989 and released his debut album, Ain't No Shame in My Game, in the following year. It scored a Top 10 Billboard Hot 100 hit with "Knockin' Boots". The following year, he released another independent LP for Epic Records, Playtime's Over. He released I Thought U Knew for I.R.S. in 1993.

In 2000, Candyman released Candyman's Knockin' Boots 2001: A Sex Odyssey, an album featuring his 1990 hit single remixed with new tracks as well."

In 2007, Candyman was featured in Nas's Where Are They Now (West Coast Remix), which also featured Breeze, Kam, King Tee, Threat, Ice-T, Sir Mix-A-Lot, and the Conscious Daughters.

Discography

Albums
 Hip Hop Addict (EP) (1989) (King Quality)
 Ain't No Shame in My Game (1990) (Epic)
 Playtime's Over (1991) (Sony)
 I Thought U Knew (1993) (IRS)
 Phukk Watcha Goin' Thru (1995) (Ruckus)
 Knockin' Boots 2001: A Sex Odyssey (2001) (X-Ray Records)

Singles

References

1968 births
Living people
African-American rappers
Rappers from Los Angeles
African-American record producers
Record producers from Los Angeles
21st-century American rappers
21st-century African-American musicians
20th-century African-American people